Stijn van Gassel (born 17 October 1996) is a Dutch professional footballer who plays as a goalkeeper for Eredivisie club Excelsior.

Club career

Helmond Sport
Van Gassel made his professional debut in the Eerste Divisie for Helmond Sport on 22 April 2016 in a game against FC Oss. In the 2016–17 season, he played the final games due to an injury to starting goalkeeper Ferhat Kaya. In the same season, he signed a contract extension with Helmond Sport until 2019. Due to Kaya's departure, Van Gassel became the starting goalkeeper of Helmond Sport ahead of the 2017–18 season.

Excelsior
On 12 March 2021, Van Gassel rejected an offer by Helmond Sport to extend his contract, in order to pursue an opportunity to play at a higher level. On 31 May 2021, he agreed to sign for fellow Eerste Divisie club Excelsior on a two-year contract starting 1 July. He made his debut for the club on the opening day of the 2021–22 season in a 1–0 home loss to TOP Oss. This match also marked his 150th professional appearance.

References

External links
 

1996 births
People from Venray
Footballers from Limburg (Netherlands)
Living people
Dutch footballers
Helmond Sport players
Excelsior Rotterdam players
Eerste Divisie players
Association football goalkeepers